William Kund (born March 30, 1946) is a former American cyclist. He competed in the 1000m time trial at the 1964 Summer Olympics.  He is also a photographer with works on display with the Art of the Olympians.

References

External links
Location photography by Bill Kund

1946 births
Living people
American male cyclists
Olympic cyclists of the United States
Cyclists at the 1964 Summer Olympics
Pan American Games medalists in cycling
Pan American Games bronze medalists for the United States
Medalists at the 1967 Pan American Games